Aishiteru may refer to:

"Aishiteru" (Miho Komatsu song)
 "Aishiteru" (Mika Nakashima song)
 "Aishiteru" (Ken Hirai song)
 Aishiteru: Kaiyō, a 2006 Japanese manga series by Minoru Itō